Calytrix duplistipulata, also known as the inland pink starflower, is a species of plant in the myrtle family Myrtaceae that is endemic to Western Australia.

It blooms between March and November producing pink-purple star-shaped flowers.

Found on undulating plains in the eastern Wheatbelt and the south western Goldfields-Esperance regions of Western Australia where it grows on sandy soils.

References

Plants described in 1987
duplistipulata
Flora of Western Australia